Kenga Ida (born 20 August 1991) is a Japanese swimmer. He competed in the men's 100 metre butterfly event at the 2018 FINA World Swimming Championships (25 m), in Hangzhou, China.

References

External links
 

1991 births
Living people
Japanese male butterfly swimmers
Place of birth missing (living people)
21st-century Japanese people